Tainae is an Angan language of Gulf Province, Papua New Guinea. Famba (Paiguna, and Pio of Kotidanga Rural LLG are the main villages.

A grammatical sketch of Tainae was written by Carlson (1991).

References

Angan languages
Languages of Gulf Province